Colón District may refer to:

 Colón District, Mora, in Mora Canton, San José Province, Costa Rica
 Colón District, Panama, in Colón Province, Panama

See also
 Colón (disambiguation)

District name disambiguation pages